Marchuk is a Ukrainian patronymic surname from the personal name Marko, a variant of Marcus. Notable people with the surname include:

Andriy Marchuk (born 1997), Ukrainian goalkeeper
Gury Marchuk (1925–2013), Russian-Soviet scientist
Ivan Marchuk (born 1936), Ukrainian painter
Russ Marchuk (born 1946), Canadian politician
Sergey Marchuk (1952–2016), Russian-Soviet speed skater
Yevhen Marchuk (1941–2021), Ukrainian politician, Prime Minister (1995–1996)

See also
 

Ukrainian-language surnames
Surnames of Ukrainian origin
Patronymic surnames